
Lębork County is a unit of territorial administration and local government (powiat) in Pomeranian Voivodeship, northern Poland, on the Baltic coast. It came into being on January 1, 1999, as a result of the Polish local government reforms passed in 1998.

As of 2019 its total population is 66,196, out of which the population of Lębork is 35,333, that of Łeba is 3,644, and the rural population is 27,219.

Lębork County on a map of the counties of Pomeranian Voivodeship

Lębork County is bordered by Wejherowo County to the east, Kartuzy County to the south-east, Bytów County to the south and Słupsk County to the west. It also borders the Baltic Sea to the north.

Administrative division
The county is subdivided into five gminas (two urban and three rural). These are listed in the following table, in descending order of population.

Transport
National:

 national road no. 6 state border - Kołbaskowo - Łęgowo (przez Lębork)

Provincial:

 provincial road No. 212 Osowo Lęborskie - Kamionka (via Cewice)
 provincial road No. 213 Słupsk - Celbowo (via Wicko)
 provincial road No. 214 Łeba - Warlubie (via Wicko, Lębork)

References

 
Kashubia
Land counties of Pomeranian Voivodeship